Cultural depictions of John F. Kennedy, the 35th American president, include films, songs, games, toys, stamps, coins, artwork, and other portrayals.

Film and television

Fictionalized
 PT 109 (1963)
 The Missiles of October (1974; docudrama, made-for-TV play)
 Young Joe, the Forgotten Kennedy (1977)
 Kennedy (1983 miniseries)
 Robert Kennedy and His Times (1985 miniseries)
 Prince Jack (1985)
 Hoover vs. The Kennedys (1987)
 The Kennedys of Massachusetts (1990 miniseries)
 JFK (1991)
 A Woman Named Jackie (1991 miniseries)
 JFK: Reckless Youth (1993 miniseries)
 Red Dwarf (1997 series)
 The Rat Pack (1998 film)
 Thirteen Days (2000)
 Clone High (2002-2003 animated series)
 Virtual JFK (2008 docudrama)
 The Kennedys (2011 miniseries)
 The Butler (2013)
 Killing Kennedy (2013 TV movie)
 LBJ (2016)
 Jackie (2016 film)
 The Crown (2017)
 "The Kennedy Curse" (2018, season 2, episode 5 of Timeless (Caspar Phillipson)) 
 Project Blue Book (2020 TV season)
 Blonde (2022)

Documentaries
 Primary (1960)
 Crisis: Behind a Presidential Commitment (1963)
 The Making of the President 1960 (1963; based on the book)
 John F. Kennedy: Years of Lightning, Day of Drums (1964)
 American Presidents: Life Portraits (1999 series)
 Roots of the Cuban Missile Crisis (2001)
 The Search for Kennedy's PT 109 (2002)
 Bobby Kennedy for President (2018 series)

Stylistic
 Forrest Gump (1994)
 Timequest (2002)
 Bubba Ho-Tep (2002)
 An American Affair (2008)
 X-Men: First Class (2011)

 Brett Stimely
 My First Love (1988)
 Watchmen (2009)
 Transformers: Dark of the Moon (2011)
 Parkland (2013)
 The Terror of Hallow's Eve (2017)

Depictions of the John F. Kennedy assassination

Stage production
 JFK: A Musical Drama (1997)
 JFK (2016), a three-act opera by David T. Little with an English-language libretto by Royce Vavrek. Based on the final night of Kennedy's life at the Hotel Texas in Fort Worth.

Music
Over 200 musical works have been released about JFK, most of which were released following his assassination. Among these are:
The First Family, a comedic impersonation album written and performed by Vaughn Meader (1962)
"PT-109", written by Marijohn Wilkin and Fred Burch, sung by Jimmy Dean (1962)
 "In the Summer of His Years", lyrics by Herb Kretzmer and music by David Lee, first sung by Millicent Martin (1963)
"Elegy for J.F.K." by Igor Stravinsky (1964)
"That Was the President", written and sung by Phil Ochs (1965)
"He Was a Friend of Mine", written by Jim McGuinn, sung by The Byrds (1965)
The Kennedy Dream, an album by Oliver Nelson (1967) 
"Crucifixion", written and sung by Phil Ochs (1967)
"Abraham, Martin and John", written by Dick Holler, sung by Dion (1968)
”Murder Most Foul”, written by Bob Dylan, alludes to the events around Kennedy’s assassination throughout the song (2020)

Artwork

 Presidential portrait, painted by Aaron Shikler (1970)
 John F. Kennedy Memorial, 1965, London, bust by Jacques Lipchitz
  John Fitzgerald Kennedy Memorial, 1965 bas-relief sculpture in Portland, Oregon, artist unknown
 John F. Kennedy Memorial, 1965 Brooklyn portrait bust (replacement dedicated in 2010) by Neil Estern 
 J. F. Kennedy Memorial, 1968 original, 2013 recreation, mosaic by Kenneth Budd in Birmingham, England
 John F. Kennedy, 1988 Boston statue by Isabel McIlvain

Toys and games
PT-109 (model kit)
PT-109 edition John F. Kennedy "G.I. Joe" action figure
Battlestations: Midway, in which Kennedy appears, commanding Motor Torpedo Boat PT-109, in the single player campaign mission "Defense of the Philippines".
Call of Duty: Black Ops, in which Kennedy appears as a non-playable character in the single player campaign mission "U.S.D.D." as well as a playable character in the "Zombies" game mode on the map "Five".

Governmental images

 Presidents of the United States on U.S. postage stamps § John F. Kennedy
 Five cents John Kennedy
 Kennedy half dollar

See also
 Cultural depictions of Jacqueline Kennedy Onassis
 List of memorials to John F. Kennedy

References